Grant A. Rice is an American theatrical producer, manager, and consultant.

Biography
Grant A. Rice has produced, managed, and consulted on over 60 theatrical productions around the world.

He graduated with honors in Theatre Arts from McDaniel College in Westminster, Maryland, and received his MFA in Theatrical Management and Producing from Columbia University in New York City.

Rice began producing at the Theatre on the Hill, located northwest of Baltimore, Maryland.

Rice won an ACTF Kennedy Center award for “Excellence in Theatrical Lighting Design” for the production of Loose Ends.

Rice is a founding member of CoProducers (a commercial producing organization), The Storefront Theatre (a non-profit off-Broadway company), board member of the National Conservatory of Dramatic Arts in Washington, DC, a board-certified member of the Association of Theatrical Press Agents and Managers, and a member of the Off-Broadway League of Theatres and Producers.

Broadway, Off-Broadway, and US tour credits
Rice has received credits for the following Broadway, Off-Broadway, and US national tours as a manager or producer:

Little Shop of Horrors
Brooklyn: The Musical
Flower Drum Song
Urban Cowboy
Chicago
The Lion King
The Crucible
Long Day's Journey Into Night
Glengarry Glen Ross
Elaine Stritch: At Liberty
One Flew Over The Cuckoo's Nest
Harlem Song
Footloose
Titanic
Wrong Mountain
The Music Man
Stomp
Three Mo' Tenors
Dudu Fisher: Something Old, Something New
Dublin Carol
Rags
Egyptian RatScrew
Gentlemen's Bet
Dead Divas
Rosencrantz and Guildenstern
Valerie Shoots Andy
Edge
It's An Art: The Music Of Steven Schwartz

Theatre on the Hill credits (manager/producer)
The Dining Room
My Fair Lady
Blood Brothers
The Sound of Music
Noises Off
Sleuth
A Christmas Carol
Winnie The Pooh
Rumplestiltskin
Aladdin
Peter Pan
The House of Blue Leaves
Gypsy

References

External links

"Theatre Security and Patron Safety in a Post-September 11th World:  Mitigating Terrorist Attacks on Broadway Theatres"
Granticus Productions

Year of birth missing (living people)
Living people
Businesspeople from Baltimore
McDaniel College alumni
Columbia University School of the Arts alumni
American theatre managers and producers